Sveti Danijel is a dispersed settlement in the hills east of Dravograd in the Carinthia region in northern Slovenia.

The local church, from which the settlement gets its name, is dedicated to the Prophet Daniel. It was built in 1625 on the site of an earlier Gothic church. It was also extensively rebuilt after fires in 1644 and in 1780. It belongs to the Parish of Trbonje.

References

External links
Sveti Danijel on Geopedia

Populated places in the Municipality of Dravograd